Ephysteris speciosa is a moth in the family Gelechiidae. It was described by Povolný in 1977. It is found in north-eastern Iran.

References

Ephysteris
Moths described in 1977